The 2018 Canadian Senior Curling Championships was held March 24 to 29, 2018 in Stratford, Ontario.

Men's

Teams
The teams are listed as follows:

Round-robin standings

Championship Pool Standings

Seeding Pool Standings

Playoffs

Women

Teams
The teams are listed as follows:

Round-robin standings

Championship Pool Standings

Seeding Pool Standings

Playoffs

References

External links

2018 in Canadian curling
Canadian Senior Curling Championships
Curling in Ontario
March 2018 sports events in Canada
2018 in Ontario
Sport in Stratford, Ontario